Joulu (Christmas) is the fourth album of Finnish a cappella ensemble Rajaton, released on October 24, 2003. It is a double album, consisting of Christmas songs sung entirely in Finnish. Disc 1 is a studio album and contains both original tracks and new arrangements of traditional Christmas songs, including Finnish versions of carols Jingle Bells (Kulkuset), Silent Night (Jouluyö, Juhlayö) and The Christmas Song (Joululaulu). Disc 2 is a live album, recorded in Karis Church, and consists of eleven devout tracks. The album peaked at #2 on the Finnish album chart and has sold double platinum.

Track listing

Disk 1

 JoululauluLyrics: Sakari Topelius / Music & Arr. Jussi Chydenius
 Tonttu Words: Viktor Rydberg / Finnish lyrics: Walter Juva / Music: Lyyli Wartiovaara-Kallioniemi /  Arr. Jussi Chydenius
 Tähtilaulu Lyrics: Helena Viertola / Music & Arr. Anna-Marie Kähärä
 Ketun Joululaulu Lyrics: Traditional / Music & Arr. Mia Makaroff, Hannu Lepola & Jussi Chydenius
 Pukki Tietää Lyrics: Arto Tamminen & Kim Kuusi / Music: Kim Kuusi / Arr. Jussi Chydenius
 Kulkuset Music: James Pierpont, E. Sandström & G. Westerberg / Finnish lyrics: Kullervo / Arr. Iiro Rantala & Hannu Lepola
 Varpunen Jouluaamuna Words: Sakari Topelius / Finnish lyrics: K.A.Hougberg / Music: Otto Kotilainen / Arr. Anna-Marie Kähärä
 Talvi-Iltana Lyrics: Einari Vuorela / Music & Arr. Jussi Chydenius
 Joulun Neiet Lyrics: Eino Leino / Music & Arr. Jussi Chydenius
 Jouluyö, JuhlayöMusic: Franz Gruber / Finnish lyrics: K.O.Schönemann / Arr. Jarmo Saari 
 JoululauluLyrics: Robert Wells / Music: Mel Tormé / Finnish lyrics: Riikkamaria Paakkunainen / Arr. Pessi Lavanto

Disk 2
 Seimeen Syntynyt Lyrics: Oke Peltonen / Music: Leevi Madetoja
 Jeesuslapsen Joululahjat Lyrics: Jaakko Haavio / Music: Jaakko Hulkkonen
 Jeesuksen Seimellä Lyrics: Lempi Vihervaara / Music: Raimo Tanskanen
 Ja Neitsyt Pikku Poijuttansa  Lyrics: Severi Nuormaa / Music: Selim Palmgren / Arr. Ilkka Kuusisto
 Joululaulu (Arkihuolesi Kaikki Heitä)   Lyrics: Alpo Noponen / Music: Leevi Madetoja
 Toivioretkellä (Maa On Niin Kaunis)  Music: Traditional / Finnish lyrics: Hilja Haahti / Arr. Traditional & Jussi Chydenius
 En Etsi Valtaa, Loistoa  Lyrics: Sakari Topelius / Music: Jean Sibelius / Finnish lyrics: Unknown
 Hiljene, Maa Lyrics: Lauri Pohjanpää / Music: Ilmo Riihimäki
 Vuotaa Armo, Taivaan Ilo Lyrics: Jaakko Haavio / Music: Ilkka Kuusisto
 Jouluhymni (Rauhaa, Vain Rauhaa) Lyrics: Une Haarnoja / Music: Ahti Sonninen
 Heinillä Härkien Kaukalon Music: Traditional / Finnish lyrics: Martti Korpilahti / Arr. Jussi Chydenius

References

External links
 Official Rajaton website
 Rajaton - Joulu at Last.fm

2001 albums
Rajaton albums